Slow violence is violence which occurs gradually and is not necessarily visible. Slow violence is 'incremental and accretive', contrasted with other violences that are spectacular and instantaneous. The key outcome of slow violence is environmental degradation, long-term pollution and climate change. Slow violence is also closely linked to many instances of environmental racism. Rob Nixon states that people lacking resources or people who are living in poverty are the main casualties of slow violence, as it is "built on the bedrock of social inequality".

The term slow violence was coined by Rob Nixon in his 2011 book Slow Violence and the Environmentalism of the Poor.

Definitions 
Violence is typically conceived of as an event or action that is immediate, explosive and spectacular.

Nixon defines slow violence as "a violence that occurs gradually and out of sight, a violence of delayed destruction that is dispersed across time and space, an attritional violence that is typically not viewed as violence at all". Thom Davies however challenges the standard that slow violence is 'out of sight', but instead could be out of sight to a particular person or people. He also states that a lack of understandings of process, interactions, and effects can result in slow violence. Shannon O'Lear provides another definition stating that slow violence is indirect and latent, and that "it can result from epistemic and political dominance of particular narratives or understandings."

Concepts of slow violence can be traced back to the 1960s. In 1969, Johan Galtung conceived of structural violence. However, slow violence is different from structural violence, as slow violence occurs over a period of many years or generations. Structural violence and slow violence are closely linked. Structural inequality can morph into forms of slow violence.

Examples

Petrochemical Infrastructure 

Communities surrounded by petrochemical infrastructure endure toxic pollution, which is defined by Thom Davies as a type of violence. However, this type of slow violence is not entirely invisible to the people they impact. People subject to slow violence gradually witness the daily impacts of that violence. Davies records instances of slow violence caused by petrochemical infrastructure in Freetown, Louisiana, where 136 petrochemical plants reside. This instance of slow violence is a form of environmental racism, as it is occurring on land with a population of 95% African Americans.

Indigenous Reserve 12 
Slow violence has been recorded affecting the Indigenous peoples that once inhabited Yuquot, British Columbia. Indigenous peoples were relocated from Yuquot to Ahaminaquus Indian Reserve 12, in Vancouver Island by the Canadian government in the late 1960s  The Department of Indian Affairs leased 30 acres of this land to Tasis Company who opened a Kraft pulp mill in 1968, on the same day of the closure of the Yuquot day school. The mill produced  noise, air and water pollution, while also resulting in a road constructed over Muchalaht graves. Over time, the Department of Indian Affairs required the Indigenous peoples to give up their rights to reside on Ahaminaquus land, as well as their right to pursue health related claims from their residency. The Indigenous peoples claimed to have lost cultural opportunities and practices as a direct result of the pollution, as it was degrading the land. Paige Raibmon states that these circumstances represent modern-day colonialism.

Policing 
Contemporary policing has been reported as a form of slow violence against marginalized communities. Rory Kramer and Brianna Remster state that police impose slow violence on Black and Brown Americans through racial and class-based harms inflicted by the state. Slow violence results in cultural trauma for people of colour, which is defined as "when members of a collective feel they have been subjected to a horrendous event that leaves indelible marks upon their group consciousness, marking their memories forever and changing their future in fundamental and irrevocable ways."

Women and Slow Violence 
Women globally face instances of slow violence. Amy Piedalue who conducted research in Hyderabad, India states that the women "live and work in spaces of dispossession and marginalization", and that the slow violence they endure is specific to the dense urban settlement they exist in. They experience mobility constraints, due to economic resources being limited, as well as public safety concerns. Piedalue also reports that slow violence in these urban settlements is seen through illness, unemployment, hunger, the decaying of sanitation and infrastructures, and limited access to education.

Counter-violence 

Communities impacted by slow violence can resist this violence through counter-violent agendas. Resistance towards slow violence often occurs in the form of environmentalism. These movements when countering slow violence may refuse the distinction between environmental and social justice. For example, in Kenya, the Green Belt Movement mobilise the gradual violence of deforestation and soil erosion. The Movement was positioned at the crossroads between environmental and women's rights, because the environmental degradation being countered has common origins with the dispossession of economic resources during the colonial regime, especially towards women. Slow nonviolence has been suggested as a method of counter-violence by Piedalue who theorizes it, "as focused on long-term incremental change, which not only responds to violence but is also productive of alternative visions and modalities of nonviolent social relationships and interdependencies". Piedalue states that slow nonviolence is a method of undoing future and past violence. Slow nonviolence approaches include protests, engagement from media sources, and public events, but as Piedalue states it operates mostly "through the intimacies of everyday life" and spaces such as homes or schools.

References 

Violence